Mitsuye Yamada (born July 5, 1923) is a Japanese American poet, essayist, and feminist and human rights activist. She was one of the first and most vocal Asian American women writers to write about the wartime incarceration of Japanese Americans.

Early life
Mitsuye Yamada was born as Mitsuye Mei Yasutake in Fukuoka, Japan. Her parents were Jack Kaichiro Yasutake and Hide Shiraki Yasutake, both first-generation Japanese Americans (Issei) residing in Seattle, Washington . Her mother was  visiting relatives in Japan when she was born, but had to return to Seattle to care for one of her brothers. Mitsuye was left in the care of a neighboring family in Fukuoka until she was 3 1/2 years old, when her father's friend brought her back to Seattle. At age 9, she returned to Japan to live with her paternal grandparents for 18 months. Upon returning, she spent the remainder of her childhood in Seattle with her parents and three brothers. Mitsuye's family lived in Beacon Hill, an Asian residential enclave, and she graduated from Cleveland High School.

Incarceration 
When World War II broke out, Mitsuye's father Jack Yasutake was branded an enemy alien and arrested on suspicion of espionage. Like hundreds of other Japanese Americans, he was arrested without proof of wrongdoing, and was later exonerated after the war. Jack worked as a translator for the Immigration and Naturalization Service and also was the head of the local Senryū poetry club. 

In 1942, after Executive Order 9066 was signed, Mitsuye and the rest of her family were incarcerated at Minidoka War Relocation Center, Idaho.

Life after incarceration 
Mitsuye was allowed to leave the concentration camp with her brother Mike because they renounced loyalty to the Emperor of Japan. Both went on to attend the University of Cincinnati. Mike was soon expelled because the U.S. Air Force was conducting "sensitive wartime research on campus and requested his removal" but Mitsuye was allowed to continue studying at the University (Yamada, 1981)

During the time of Mitsuye's upbringing, Japanese society did not offer women much freedom; they were unable to obtain higher education or choose a husband on their own accord. Yamada's personal and familiar ordeals throughout World War II and observations of her mother's way of life bring anti-racist and feminist attitudes to her works.

Mitsuye married Yoshikazu Yamada in 1950, and the couple had four children together. Mitsuye has seven grandchildren and three great-grandchildren.

Mitsuye became a naturalized U.S. citizen in 1955. She considers herself Nisei (second-generation Japanese American).

Education and career
Although Yamada began her studies at the University of Cincinnati, she left in 1945 to attend New York University, where she received a B.A. in English and Art in 1947. She earned an M.A. in English Literature and Research from the University of Chicago in 1953. She began teaching at Cypress College in 1968, and retired in 1989 as a Professor of English.

She wrote her first book, Camp Notes and Other Poems, during and just after her internment during the Second World War, but it remained unpublished until 1976. In this collection, the "wartime conflicts of Japanese Americans are traced back to the injustice of Executive Order 9066 and to visible and invisible racism against Japanese and Americans of Japanese ancestry both inside and outside the camp." (Usui, 2002). Yamada's professed purpose for writing is to encourage Asian American women to speak out and defy the cultural codes that encourage Asian American women to be silent. (Sheffer, 2003). Yamada recognizes that Asian American women have not been fully represented as "sites of complex intersections of race, gender, and national identity." (Yamamoto, 2000). Yamada once said, "Asian Pacific women need to affirm our culture while working within to change it." (Geok-Lin, 1993).

Yamada's first publication was Camp Notes and Other Poems. The book is a chronological documentary, beginning with "Evacuation" from Seattle, moving in the camp through "Desert Storm," and concluding with poems recounting the move to Cincinnati. "Cincinnati" illustrates the visible racial violence and "The Question of Loyalty" shows the invisible humiliation of the Japanese during World War II. She wrote the book to promote public awareness surrounding the discrimination against the Japanese during the war and to prompt deeper discussion of these issues. With this publication, Yamada challenged Japanese traditions that demand silence from the female.

She contributed two essays to This Bridge Called My Back: Radical Writings from Women of Color. (1981) "Invisibility is an Unnatural Disaster" reflects the double invisibility of being both Asian and a woman while "Asian Pacific American Women and Feminism" urges women of color to develop a feminist agenda that addresses their particular concerns. That same year, Yamada joined Nellie Wong in a biographical documentary on public television, "Mitsuye and Nellie: Two Asian-American Woman Poets." The film tells of actual events that happened to the speakers, their parents, grandparents and relatives. It uses poetry to tell Asian American history of biculturalism.

In 1982, she received a Vesta Award from the Los Angeles Woman's Building.

"Desert Run: Poems and Stories", returns to her experience at the internment camp. Here, Yamada explores her heritage and discovers that her identity involves a cultural straddle between Japan and the US, which she describes in "Guilty on Both Counts. " Some poems, especially "The Club," indicate that Yamada expanded her point of view to include feminist as well as racist issues because they recount sexual and domestic violence against women. Some of her poems are revisions of earlier versions in Camp Notes. The book contains the history and transition of the Japanese American in the U.S., including Yamada's perspective on gender discrimination.

At 96 years old, Yamada has released her latest work, Full Circle: New and Selected Poems
Publisher: University of California at Santa Barbara Department of Asian American Studies.

Works
1976 – Camp Notes and Other Poems
1976 – Anthologized in Poetry from Violence
1976 – Lighthouse
1976 – The Japanese-American Anthology
1981 – Mitsuye and Nellie: Two Asian-American Woman Poets
1989 – Desert Run: Poems and stories
1992 – Camp notes and other poems [2nd edition]
2003 – Three Asian American Writers Speak Out on Feminism
2019 — Full Circle: New and Selected Poems"

Compilation inclusions
Sowing Ti Leaves (Multicultural Women Writers, 1991)
"Invisibility is an unnatural disaster: Reflections of an Asian American Woman" (This Bridge Called My Back: Radical Writings by women of color) ed. Cherrie L. Moraga/ Gloria E. Anzaldua
"Cultural Influences: Asian/Pacific American" (Women Poets of the World)
"Cincinnati" (Bold Words: A century of Asian American writing) ed. Rajini Srikanth and Esther Y. Iwanaga
"Looking Out" (New Worlds of Literature) ed. Jerome Beaty/J. Paul Hunter
"To the Lady" (Literature: Thinking, Reading and Writing Critically) ed. Sylvan Barnet, Morton Berman, William Burto, William E. Cain
"Cincinnati, 1943" (Sing, whisper, shout, PRAY! Feminist Visions for a just world) ed. M, Jacqui Alexander, Lisa Albrecht, Sharon Day, Mab Segrest
"Invisibility is an Unnatural disaster: reflections of an Asian American woman" (Constellations: A contextual reader for writers) ed. John Schilb, Elizabeth Flynn, John Clifford
"Desert Run" (Making Face, Making Soul: Creative and Critical Perspectives by Women of Color) ed. Gloria Anzaldua
"Marriage Was a Foreign Country" (Literature Alive! The Art of Oral Interpretation) ed. Teri gamble, Michael Gamble
"Warning" (Making More Waves: New Writing by Asian American Women) ed. Elaine H Kim, Lilia V Villanueva, And Asian United of California
"I learned to sew" (Southern California Women Writers and Artists) ed. Rara Avis
"Mitsuye Yamada" (Yellow LIght: The Flowering of Asian-American Artists) ed. Amy Ling
"A Bedtime Story" (Arrangement in Literature) Medallion Edition/American Reads (textbook)
"Masks of Women" (On Women Turning 70) interviews by Cathleen Rountree
"She Often Spoke of Suicide" (My Story's On: Ordinary Women Extrodinary Lives) ed. Paula Ross
"Legacy of Silence" (Last Witnesses Reflection onf the Wartime Internemt of Japanese Americans) ed. Erica Harth
(Textbook but highlights teaching career) "Experiential Approaches to teaching Joy Kogawa's Obasan" (Teaching American Ethnic Literatures" ed. John R Maitino and David R Peck
"Living in a Transformed Desert" (Placing the Academy: Essays on landscape, work, and identity) ed. Jennifer Sinor and Rona Kaufman

Awards
1980 - Receives Orange County Arts Alliance Literary Arts Award.
1982 - Receives Vesta Award for Writing, Woman's Building of Los Angeles.
1983 - Serves as Resource Scholar, Multicultural Women's Institute, University of Chicago.
1984 - Receives Writer's Fellowship, Yaddo Artist Colony, Saratoga Springs, New York.
Receives Award for Contribution to the Status of Women from the organization Women For: Orange County.
1985 - Receives Women's Network Alert Literature Award.
1987 - Visiting Poet, Pitzer College, Claremont, California.
Receives Distinguished Teacher Award from North Orange County Community College District
Receives award for contributions to ethnic studies from MELUS.
1990-1991 - Receives Woman of Achievement Award from the Santiago Ranch Foundation.
1992 - Receives the Jesse Bernard Wise Women Award from the Center for Women's Policy Studies, Washington, D.C.
Commencement speaker at CSU Northridge.
1995 - Receives "Write On, Women!" award from the Southern California Library for Social Studies and Research.
1997 - Receives Give Women Voice Award—during International Women's Day, U.S.A.
2007 - KCET Local Hero of the Year for Asian Pacific American Heritage Month
2009 - Receives Honorary Doctorate, Simmons College Boston

References
Notes

Sources
Lim, Shirley Geok-lin. (1993, Fall). Feminist and ethnic literary theories in Asian American literature. Feminist Studies, 19, 571.
Kolmar, W., & Bartkowski, F. (Eds.). (1999). Feminist theory: A reader. California: Mayfield Publishing company.
Sheffer, J. (2003). Three Asian American writers speak out on feminism. Iris, 47, 91.
Usui, M. The Literary Encyclopedia [Online Database] Yamada, Mitsuye. (March 21, 2002). Retrieved November 14, 2005, from http://www.litencyc.com/php/speople.php?rec=true&UID=4825
 Wong, N., Woo, M., Yamada, M. Three Asian American Writers Speak Out on Feminism, Radical Women Publications, 2003.
Yamada, M. (1981). Invisibility is an unnatural disaster: Reflections of an Asian American woman. In C. McCann, & S. Kim (eds.), Feminist theory reader: Local and global perspectives (pp. 174– 178). New York, NY: Taylor & Francis Books, Inc.
Yamamoto, T. (January 31, 2000). In/Visible difference:Asian American women and the politics of spectacle. Race, Gender, & Class,1,'' 43.
Mitsuye Yamada papers. MS-R071. Special Collections and Archives, The UC Irvine Libraries, Irvine, California.

External links
« LINK TO Mitsuye Yamada Website

http://www.oac.cdlib.org/findaid/ark:/13030/tf5d5nb2wc/admin/

1923 births
Living people
American activists
American poets
Japanese-American civil rights activists
Japanese-American internees
American writers of Japanese descent
University of Chicago alumni
People from Fukuoka
American expatriates in Japan
American women poets
American poets of Asian descent
American women writers of Asian descent
American academics of Japanese descent
Women civil rights activists
20th-century American women
21st-century American women
Asian-American feminists